A cake firework, also known as a multiple tube device, is a firework comprising a series of Roman candles, small aerial shells, or a combination of both, connected together by a high-speed fuse.  Typically, the internal fusing is set to fire each tube in series, or to fire several tubes at the same time, or a combination of these.  Typically a cake will resemble from the outside a simple cube or other rectangular covered shape; after firing, a large number of cardboard tubes (the candles) will be visible in the top of the firework (the paper cover having been blown off by the discharging stars). In a traditional cake, all the candles point upwards; a variant is called the fan or angle cake.

Cakes are one of the most popular types of firework, as they can create spectacular and long-lasting effects from a single ignition while minimising safety concern.  In the UK, the reclassification of aerial shells to Category 4 has popularised cakes as a method for achieving similar effects while staying within safety guidelines, particularly by firing multiple candles at the same time.

Cakes vary greatly in size, weight and duration. Large "finale Cakes" containing dozens of shells up to -diameter are not uncommon, and some cakes, particularly those containing large amounts of dragon's eggs, can weigh over  prior to discharge.

See also

References

Types of fireworks